Maklavan (also Romanized as Mākalān) is a city and capital of Sardar-e Jangal District, in Fuman County, Gilan Province, Iran.  At the 2006 census, its population was 2,170 individuals.

Gallery

References

External links 

 Aerial Map Maklavan

Populated places in Fuman County

Cities in Gilan Province